U.S. Route 250 Truck may refer to:

Virginia State Route 261
U.S. Route 250 Truck (Philippi, West Virginia)

Truck